Qujeh (also Romanized as Qūjeh) is a village in Karaftu Rural District, in the Central District of Takab County, West Azerbaijan Province, Iran. At the 2006 census, its population was 646, in 128 families.

References 

Populated places in Takab County